Selagia is a genus of snout moths described by Jacob Hübner in 1825.

Species
Selagia argyrella (Denis & Schiffermüller, 1775)
Selagia disclusella Ragonot, 1887
Selagia dissimilella Ragonot, 1887
Selagia fuscorubra Riel, 1928
Selagia griseolella Ragonot, 1887
Selagia spadicella (Hübner, 1796)
Selagia subochrella (Herrich-Schaffer, 1849)
Selagia uralensis Rebel, 1910
Selagia zernyi Toll, 1942

References

Phycitini
Pyralidae genera